Velká Deštná is the highest mountain of the Central Sudetes and the Orlické Mountains, Czech Republic with 1,115 m.

References 
 Velká Deštná at OrlickéHory.net

Mountains and hills of the Czech Republic
Mountain peaks of the Sudetes